Michigan Citizens for Justice is an advocacy and support group for Michigan sex offenders and their families. Michigan Citizens for Justice is an affiliate organization of Reform Sex Offender Laws, Inc., and one of the more than 50 organizations nationwide movement to reform sex offender laws in the United States.

Purpose
Michigan Citizens for Justice seeks to educate law-makers and the public that sex offenders should not all be treated the same, as they are a diverse group of individuals, and that contrary to popular belief, their general recidivism rate of 5% over 5 years is the second lowest of all offender groups, thus making onerous restrictions and the stigmatizing effect of public sex offender lists unfair and counterproductive when applied to all offenders without considering the individual risk and underlying facts of individual cases.

The group aims to provide support, encouragement, and information for working towards reforming the current laws and policies so that they will be based on scientific facts and will promote public safety, honor human dignity, and offer holistic prevention, healing, and restoration. The group holds that current state of sex offender registries in the United States are a nationwide problem which "destroys futures and makes it questionable as to who is a threat to society and who isn't", by pooling offenders together and automatically labeling them as monsters, regardless of what the true nature of their offense was.

The group says that offenders should be treated differently according to the severity of their offenses and that the "Romeo and Juliet" type of offenders should not be punished as harshly as those convicted of more serious sex crimes.

History
Michigan Citizens for Justice was started by Royal Oak mother, Francie Baldino after her teenage son was imprisoned for having sex with his girlfriend, who was 14 years old at the time, and after she realized the stigmatizing effect and harsh restrictions imposed on those labelled as sex offenders. In January 2012, Group leader Francie Giordano appeared in a live TV interview on The Arena with Michael Coren, discussing issues of prosecuting consensual teen sex in US.

See also
Alliance for Constitutional Sex Offense Laws
National Association for Rational Sexual Offense Laws: NARSOL
Arkansas Time After Time
Florida Action Committee
Advocates For Change
California Reform Sex Offender Laws
USA FAIR, Inc.
Illinois Voices for Reform
Women Against Registry - W.A.R

References

External links
www.micitizensforjustice.com
Reform Sex Offender Laws, Inc.
Registrants and Families Support Line

Sex offender registration
Non-profit organizations based in Michigan
Civil liberties advocacy groups in the United States